IUI most commonly refers to intrauterine insemination, a method of artificial insemination.

IUI may also refer to:

 iUI (software), a user interface library for the iPhone
 International University of Iran, founded by Ali R. Rabi
 Intelligent user interface, a user interface that involves some aspect of artificial intelligence
 The IUI conference series on intelligent user interfaces organised by the Association for Computing Machinery